Hamilton Town Hall may refer to:

 Hamilton Townhouse, a building in Hamilton, South Lanarkshire, Scotland, U.K.
 Hamilton Town Hall (Hamilton, Montana), listed on the NRHP in Ravalli County, Montana, USA
 Hamilton Town Hall, Brisbane, former town hall in the Brisbane suburb of Hamilton, Queensland, Australia